Dean Noel  (born February 21, 1969) is a former professional Canadian football fullback who played for five years in  the Canadian Football League (CFL) for the Ottawa Rough Riders and Hamilton Tiger-Cats.

College career 
Noel played college football for the Delaware State Hornets.

Professional career

Ottawa Rough Riders 
After finishing his college eligibility, Noel was drafted in the fourth round, 26th overall, by his hometown Ottawa Rough Riders, in the 1993 CFL Draft. He played in 25 regular season games for the Rough Riders over two seasons where he had four carries for 10 yards and 13 receptions for 133 yards and two touchdowns. He also recorded 42 special teams tackles, including 30 in 1994, which is an Ottawa franchise record.

Hamilton Tiger-Cats 
Noel joined the Hamilton Tiger-Cats in 1995 and played for the team for three years in 40 regular season games. He had 18 carries for 111 yards, 14 catches for 121 yards, and 57 special teams tackles.

Personal life 
Noel and his family moved from the Caribbean to Ottawa when he was four years old. His son, Serron is a professional ice hockey player who was drafted by the Florida Panthers.

References 

1969 births
Living people
Canadian football fullbacks
Delaware State Hornets football players
Ottawa Rough Riders players
Players of Canadian football from Ontario
Canadian football people from Ottawa